Dmitri Ivanovich Khomukha (born 23 August 1969) is a Turkmenistani football manager and a former player who is the current manager of FC Kaluga. He is Ukrainian by ethnicity and also has Russian citizenship.

Career 
He began to play football in Ashgabat with coach Valery Nepomnyashchy. From the second grade of the school he studied at the Ashgabat Youth Sports School  with coach Täçmyrat Agamyradow. The player’s career began in 1985 in the Kolhozçy Aşgabat team. He served in the second team of CSKA Moscow and SKA Karpaty Lviv.

Coaching career 
Graduated from the Kharkiv State Academy of Physical Culture and Moscow Higher School of Coaches. He has a UEFA PRO coaching license.

International career 
He started his international career in U-18 Soviet union team, but made a decision to play for Turkmenistan after dissolution of the Soviet Union. He played for the Turkmenistan national team at the request of his children's coach Täçmyrat Agamyradow. Held 11 mathes for the national team of Turkmenistan. Participated in the 1998 Asian Games in Thailand.

Achievements
 Russian Premier League runner-up: 1998.
 Russian Premier League bronze: 1999.
 Russian Cup winner: 2004.

International
Russia U-17
UEFA European Under-17 Championship: 2013

Russia U-19
UEFA European Under-19 Championship Runners-up: 2015

References

External links
 
 

1969 births
Living people
Soviet footballers
Turkmenistan footballers
Association football midfielders
Turkmenistan international footballers
Turkmenistan expatriate footballers
FK Köpetdag Aşgabat players
FC SKA-Karpaty Lviv players
FC Metalist Kharkiv players
FC Zenit Saint Petersburg players
PFC CSKA Moscow players
FC Shinnik Yaroslavl players
FC Akhmat Grozny players
Expatriate footballers in Ukraine
Expatriate footballers in Russia
Turkmenistan expatriate sportspeople in Ukraine
Turkmenistan expatriate sportspeople in Russia
Soviet Top League players
Soviet First League players
Russian Premier League players
Ukrainian Premier League players
Sportspeople from Ashgabat
Turkmenistan people of Ukrainian descent
Riga FC managers
Turkmenistan football managers
Footballers at the 1998 Asian Games
Asian Games competitors for Turkmenistan
Turkmenistan expatriate football managers
Russian football managers
Russian expatriate football managers
Kharkiv State College of Physical Culture 1 alumni